Joseph Stockmar (30 March 1851, in Courchavon – 28 July 1919) was a Swiss politician and President of the Swiss National Council (1896).

Works

External links 
 
 

1851 births
1919 deaths
People from Porrentruy District
Swiss Calvinist and Reformed Christians
Free Democratic Party of Switzerland politicians 
Members of the National Council (Switzerland)
Presidents of the National Council (Switzerland)